Diakhao Arrondissement (Serer proper : Jaxaaw) is an arrondissement of the Fatick Department in the Fatick Region of Senegal. Its capital is Diakhao.

Subdivisions
The arrondissement is divided administratively into rural communities and in turn into villages.

History

Diakhao is over-run by the Serer people. It was once part of the pre-colonial Kingdom of Sine.  Diakhao holds great prominence in Serer medieval history because many of the Maad a Sinigs (title for the king of Sine) were crowned at Diakhao, at least from 1350 during the reign of Maad a Sinig Maysa Wali Jaxateh Manneh  to 1969, the year the last Serer king of Sine — Maad a Sinig Mahecor Joof died. As well as being the main capital of Sine, it was also the historical residence of many of the kings of Sine. Maad a Sinig Mahecor Joof died in Diakhao on 3 August 1969.

References

Arrondissements of Senegal
Fatick Region